D. D. D. Barr House is a historic home located near Batesburg-Leesville, Lexington County, South Carolina. It was built about 1883, and is a one-story, frame, weatherboarded dwelling. The main core of the house has a hipped roof covered with metal shingles. A hip-roofed porch shelters three bays of the five-bay façade. Outbuildings include a 20th-century milk house.

It was listed on the National Register of Historic Places in 1983.

References

Houses on the National Register of Historic Places in South Carolina
Houses completed in 1883
Houses in Lexington County, South Carolina
National Register of Historic Places in Lexington County, South Carolina